Gertrude Bohnert (2 April 1908 – 20 September 1948) was a Swiss painter. Her work was part of the painting event in the art competition at the 1948 Summer Olympics. She was the first wife of the Swiss artist Hans Erni, and she died in a horse-riding accident.

References

1908 births
1948 deaths
20th-century Swiss painters
20th-century Swiss women artists
Swiss women painters
Olympic competitors in art competitions
People from Lucerne